St. Johannes Danske Lutherske Kirke (St. John's Evangelical Lutheran Church) is a church in rural Hamilton County, Nebraska. The Church is located in the unincorporated settlement of Kronborg, about three miles east of Marquette, Nebraska.  It was built in a Gothic style between 1899 and 1915.  It was added to the National Register of Historic Places in 1992.

References

External links

 St. Johns Cemetery, Kronborg

Buildings and structures in Hamilton County, Nebraska
Danish-American culture in Nebraska
Carpenter Gothic church buildings in Nebraska
Lutheran churches in Nebraska
Churches on the National Register of Historic Places in Nebraska
Historic districts on the National Register of Historic Places in Nebraska
National Register of Historic Places in Hamilton County, Nebraska